Căpâlna is a commune in Bihor County, Crișana, Romania with a population of 1,663 people (2011). It is composed of five villages: Căpâlna, Ginta (Gyanta), Rohani (Rohány), Săldăbagiu Mic (Körösszáldobágy) and Suplacu de Tinca (Tenkeszéplak). The commune is situated in the southern part of Bihor County, on the right bank of the Crișul Negru, at a distance of 40 km from Oradea, 26 km from Beiuș and 40 km from Salonta.

Demographics

Population by villages
Căpâlna commune had a population of 1,663 in 2011, which was divided into villages as follows:
466 (Săldăbagiu Mic)
411 (Suplacu de Tinca)
333 (Căpâlna)
309 (Ginta)
144 (Rohani)

Ethnic structure
Căpâlna commune had a population of 1,663 in 2011, of which:
79% are Romanian
14% are Hungarian
3% are Roma.
4% are other.

Religious makeup
The religious makeup in 2011 was as follows:
75% are Romanian Orthodox
11% are Reformed
3% are Pentecostal.
3% are Baptist.
2% are Roman Catholic.
1% are Greek-Catholic.
5% are undeclared or none.

References

Communes in Bihor County
Localities in Crișana
Place names of Hungarian origin in Romania